The  Hairy Bikers are collectively David Myers and Si King.  The pair of British celebrity chefs have presented numerous television shows, mostly for the BBC but also for the Good Food channel, that combine cooking with a motorcycling travelogue. They have made numerous series and published a range of accompanying cookery books.

Myers and King, who both have backgrounds in television production, have known each other since the 1990s. They made their first appearance on UK television as presenters of The Hairy Bikers' Cookbook on the BBC in 2004 and ran for four series. The duo followed this up with The Hairy Bikers' Food Tour of Britain, The Hairy Bikers' Mums Know Best, Hairy Bikers' Meals on Wheels, Hairy Bikers' Best of British, The Hairy Bikers' Bakeation, Hairy Dieters: How to Love Food and Lose Weight, The Hairy Bikers' Asian Adventure, The Hairy Bikers' Northern Exposure and The Hairy Bikers' Pubs That Built Britain for BBC Two, and The Hairy Bikers' Mississippi Adventure for Good Food.

Presenters
Both Myers and King have a background in TV and film production. Myers is a professional make-up artist, specialising in prosthetics, while King served as locations manager on numerous productions including the Harry Potter films and Byker Grove.

They met in 1992 on the set of a TV drama entitled The Gambling Man which was based on a Catherine Cookson novel. King was the second assistant director and Myers was head of prosthetics, hair and make-up on the production. Both got tattoos of Che Guevara on their right arm, in 2006 while filming in Argentina. Simon King is a supporter of Newcastle United.

TV series
The duo appeared on the BBC's The Hairy Bikers' Cookbook. Their TV shows are a mixture of cookery and travelogue, using a similar format and style to that previously associated with Keith Floyd, including the habit of frequently referring to the cameraman and other crew. Most shows feature the pair riding motorbikes, including the BMW R1200GS, F650GS and Triumph Rocket III. The show also features elements of the Two Fat Ladies format, including regular banter between the two stars, use of various unusual cooking locations and the use of motorbikes.

The pair have appeared on several episodes of Saturday Kitchen on the BBC, as well as on Richard & Judy on Channel 4.  They both appeared on a celebrity chefs special of The Weakest Link and in the première episode of James Martin's Brittany with Saturday Kitchen presenter James Martin.

In summer 2009 they filmed a 30-part daytime series for BBC Two, The Hairy Bikers' Food Tour of Britain, which aired weekdays starting on 24 August 2009. The series saw them visit a different county each day and cook what they considered to be that county's signature dish.

In October 2009, filming of a BBC Christmas show featuring the Hairy Bikers was halted after King was injured in an accident on Tyneside. King came off his bike when a car pulled out in front of him, while he was riding through Gosforth during rush hour. His TV partner Dave Myers was riding some distance behind him. King was taken to Newcastle General Hospital for treatment to bruising to his right leg and ribs. The hour long Hairy Bikers' Twelve Days of Christmas was shown on BBC2, 16 December 2009.

A new six part series titled The Hairy Bikers: Mums Know Best commenced broadcast in early January 2010 on BBC2.

On 25 October 2010, a new 40-episode series, The Hairy Bikers' Cook Off, was launched on BBC2. The programme includes a cook off between two families and celebrity guests.

From January to May 2010, the Hairy Bikers performed their "Big Night Out" show in theatres throughout the UK. Directed by Bob Mortimer, the show was a fun mixture of cooking and chat with a little song and dance thrown in. It explored their youth, how they met and their love of food.
In October 2010, the Hairy Bikers were guests on the BBC TV series Genius hosted by comedian Dave Gorman.

In June 2011, the Bikers appeared in the second series of Mum Knows Best. The series, made up of eight episodes, featured three 'Star Mums' whose recipes were tested and shared with the public. In addition, one of the episodes featured the world-famous 'pie village' of Denby Dale, where the Denby Dale Pie Company are based.

October 2011 saw a new series, Meals on Wheels, air on BBC2. The series fronted a campaign to save local 'meals on wheels' services around the UK.

From November to December 2011, the Bikers appeared in a 30-part BBC series called Hairy Bikers: Best of British, airing at 3:45pm on BBC2 (apart from the show's final week, in which it aired on BBC1). The series celebrated British recipes and championed local produce. In January 2012, continuing into February, BBC2 showed hour long re-versions including recipes from various episodes of the series.

After they had signed new contracts with the BBC in 2011, a new series was commissioned. The Hairy Bikers' Bakeation saw them on a gastronomic road trip, looking at baking across Europe, from Norway, the Low Countries (Netherlands, Belgium and Luxembourg), Germany, Eastern Europe (Slovakia, Hungary and Romania), Austria, Italy and France to Spain.

In March 2012, Good Food commissioned The Hairy Bikers' Mississippi Adventure, the duo's first series for the channel. UKTV gave a description of the series: "In this ultimate food and music pilgrimage, the perennially popular Hairy Bikers are getting back in the saddle as they explore the length of the iconic Mississippi River in America in pursuit of the delicious roots of soul food and Southern music." The series will be produced by Mentorn Media and the Bikers' first interactive iOS app, also produced by Mentorn, will be released to accompany the series.

In August 2012, Hairy Dieters: How to Love Food and Lose Weight showed how the Hairy Bikers' radically changed lifestyles, but stayed true to their love of great food, as they embarked on a campaign to lose two-and-a-half stone in three months, and comfortably passed their target weights.

In August 2012, Myers appeared on Channel 4's Countdown in dictionary corner, and again in January 2013.

Their new six-part series "The Hairy Bikers' Asian Adventure" premiered on BBC2 13 February 2014. The Bikers visit Hong Kong, Bangkok, Thailand, Tokyo, Mount Fuji, Kyoto, Kobe & South Korea.

Myers took part in the eleventh series of Strictly Come Dancing, partnering Karen Hauer. On 10 November 2013 he was the sixth celebrity to be eliminated from the contest.

In September 2016 the pair premiered The Hairy Bikers – Chicken & Egg on BBC 2. The show featured the pair biking across Europe, America, and the Middle East in search of the best chicken and egg recipes.  The six episodes feature the UK, France, Morocco, USA and Israel.

In 2018 Hairy Bikers appeared in Hairy Bikers' Mediterranean Adventure on BBC2 This was followed in 2019 by Hairy Bikers: Route 66, where the duo visited restaurants and producers situated along the iconic American road.

During February – March 2020, The Hairy Bikers presented the C5 five-part series The Chocolate Challenge with The Hairy Bikers, where seven chocolatiers battled it out to create, brand, and name their very own chocolate bar.

TV
The Hairy Bikers Cookbook, BBC TV, 2006 – 2008(The Hairy Bikers' Cookbook (renamed The Hairy Bikers Ride Again for the third series and The Hairy Bakers for the fourth series)
The Hairy Bakers' Christmas Special, BBC TV, 2008
The Hairy Bikers' Food Tour of Britain, BBC TV, 2009. 30 Episodes
Hairy Bikers' Twelve Days of Christmas, BBC TV, 2009
The Hairy Bikers Mums Know Best: Series 1, BBC TV, 2010. 6 Episodes
The Hairy Bikers' Cook Off, BBC TV, 2010. 40 Episodes
The Hairy Bikers Mums Know Best: Series 2, BBC TV, 2011. 9 Episodes
Meals on Wheels, BBC TV, 2011. 4 Episodes
Hairy Bikers: Best of British, BBC TV, 2011. 30 Episodes
The Hairy Bikers' Twelve Days of Christmas, BBC TV, 2011
The Hairy Bikers' Bakeation, BBC TV, 2012. 8 Episodes
Hairy Dieters, BBC TV, 2012. 4 Episodes
The Hairy Bikers' Mississippi Adventure, BBC TV, 2012
Hairy Bikers Everyday Gourmets, BBC TV, 2013. 6 Episodes
Hairy Bikers' Best of British: Series Two, BBC TV, 2013. 19 Episodes
The Hairy Bikers: Mum Knows Best – Series 2, BBC TV, 2013
The Hairy Bikers' Restoration Road Trip, BBC TV, 2013. 3 Episodes
Hairy Bikers' Meals on Wheels, Back on the Road, BBC TV, 2013. 2 Episodes
The Hairy Bikers' Asian Adventure, BBC TV, 2014. 6 Episodes
The Hairy Bikers' Northern Exposure, BBC TV, 2015. 6 Episodes
The Pubs That Built Britain, BBC TV, 2016. 15 Episodes
The Hairy Builder with Dave Myers, BBC TV, 2016. 15 Episodes
The Hairy Bikers – Chicken & Egg, BBC TV, 2016. 6 Episodes
Operation People Power, BBC TV, 2016. 5 Episodes
The Hairy Bikers' Comfort Food, BBC TV, 2017. 30 Episodes
Kitchen Garden Live with the Hairy Bikers, BBC TV, 2017
The Hairy Bikers Home For Christmas, BBC TV, 2017
Hairy Bikers' Mediterranean Adventure, BBC TV, 2018. 6 Episodes
Hairy Bikers: Route 66, BBC TV, 2019. 6 Episodes
The Chocolate Challenge with The Hairy Bikers, C5 TV, 2020. 5 Episodes
The Hairy Bikers Go North, BBC TV, 2021. 8 Episodes+1 Christmas Special
The Hairy Bikers Go Local, BBC TV, 2023. 8 Episodes

American version
History Channel released an American version of the show starring Paul Patranella and Bill Allen. The show aired for 10 episodes and was spoofed in an episode of South Park entitled "A History Channel Thanksgiving".

Awards and honours
2012 National Book Award, "Food & Drink Book of the Year" for The Hairy Dieters
Fortnum and Mason Food and Drink Awards 2022, "Personalities of the Year" for The Hairy Dieters

Bibliography

Autobiography
 The Hairy Bikers Blood, Sweat and Tyres: The Autobiography (Orion, 2015)

Cookery books
 The Hairy Bikers' Cookbook (Michael Joseph, 2006) 
 The Hairy Bikers Ride Again (Michael Joseph, 2007) 
 The Hairy Bikers' Food Tour of Britain (W&N, 2009) 
 Mums Know Best: The Hairy Bikers' Family Cookbook (W&N, 2010) 
 Mums Still Know Best: The Hairy Bikers' Best-Loved Recipes (W&N, 2011) 
 The Hairy Bikers' Perfect Pies (W&N, 2011) 
 The Hairy Bikers' Big Book of Baking (W&N, 2012) 
 The Hairy Bikers' Great Curries (W&N, 2013) 
 The Hairy Bikers' Asian Adventure (W&N, 2014) 
 The Hairy Bikers' Meat Feasts (W&N, 2015) 
 The Hairy Bikers' Chicken and Egg (Orion, 2016) 
 The Hairy Bikers' 12 Days of Christmas (Orion, 2016) 
 The Hairy Bikers' Mediterranean Adventure (Seven Dials, 2017) 
 The Hairy Bikers' British Classics (Seven Dials, 2018) 
 The Hairy Bikers' One Pot Wonders (Seven Dials, 2019) 
 The Hairy Bikers' Veggie Feasts (Seven Dials, 2020) 
 The Hairy Bikers' Everyday Winners (Seven Dials, 2021) 
 The Hairy Bikers' Brilliant Bakes (Seven Dials, 2022)

Diet books
The Hairy Dieters: Eat for Life (W&N, 2013) 
The Hairy Dieters: How to Love Food and Lose Weight (W&N, 2014) 
The Hairy Dieters: Good Eating (W&N, 2014) 
The Hairy Dieters: Fast Food (W&N, 2016) 
The Hairy Dieters: Go Veggie (Orion, 2017) 
The Hairy Dieters Make It Easy (Seven Dials, 2018) 
The Hairy Dieters Simple Healthy Food (Seven Dials, 2022)

References

External links

Hairy Bikers on the BBC

British television presenters
English television chefs
English television personalities
Entertainer duos
Motorcycle television series
English autobiographers
British cookbook writers
Diet food writers